The Classis Ravennas ("Fleet of Ravenna"), later awarded the honorifics praetoria and Pia Vindex, was the second most senior fleet of the imperial Roman Navy after the Classis Misenensis.

History 
Ravenna had been used for ship construction and as a naval port at least since the Roman civil wars, but the permanent classis Ravennas was established by Caesar Augustus in 27 BC .  It was commanded by a praefectus classis, drawn from the highest ranks of the equestrian class, those with a net worth more than 200,000 sesterces, and its mission was to control the Adriatic Sea and perhaps the eastern part of the Mediterranean Sea. As the honorific praetoria, awarded by Vespasian for its support during the civil war of AD 69, suggests, together with the classis Misenensis, it formed the naval counterpart of the Praetorian Guard, a permanent naval force at the emperor's direct disposal.

Its home port of Classis (modern Classe), which was named after the fleet, was built under Augustus, and included a canal, the Fossa Augusta, which united the port with the lagoons of the interior, as well as with the river Po to the north. Naval arsenals and docks stretched along the Fossa, in a complex that reached 22 km in length. According to a passage by Cassius Dio, related by Jordanes, the harbour could accommodate 250 ships.

The classis Ravennas recruited its crews mostly from the East, especially from Egypt. Since Rome did not face any naval threat in the Mediterranean, the bulk of the fleet's crews was idle. Some of the sailors were based in Rome itself, initially housed in the barracks of the Praetorian Guard, but later given their own barracks, the Castra Ravennatium across the Tiber. There they were used to stage mock naval battles (naumachiae), and operated the mechanism that deployed the canvas canopy of the Colosseum. In 70, Emperor Vespasian also levied the legio II Adiutrix from the marines of classis Ravennas.

In the civil war of 192-193, the fleet supported Septimius Severus, and, together with the classes Misenensis, it participated in the campaign against Pescennius Niger, transporting his legions to the East. The fleet remained active in the East for the next few decades, where the emergence of the Persian Sassanid Empire posed a new threat that required frequent reinforcements to be ferried.

In 324 the fleet's ships participated in the campaign of Constantine the Great against Licinius and his decisive naval victory in the Battle of the Hellespont. Afterwards, the bulk of the ships were moved to Constantinople, where emperor Constantine had moved the capital of the Roman Empire.

praefecti classis Ravennatis 
The following list is based on Werner Eck and Hans Lieb, "Ein Diplom für die Classis Ravennas vom 22. November 206", Zeitschrift für Papyrologie und Epigraphik, 96 (1993), pp. 85f

List of known ships 
The following ship names and types of the classis Ravennas have survived:
 2 quinqueremes: Augustus, Victoria.
 6 quadriremes: Fortuna, Mercurius, Neptunus, Padus, Vesta, Victoria.
 28 triremes: Aesculapius, Apollo, Aquila, Archinix, Ariadna, Augustus, Castor, Concordia, Costantia, Danae, Danubius, Diana, Felicitas, Hercules, Mars, Mercurius, Minerva, Neptunus, Nereis, Pax, Pietas, Pinnata, Providentia, Silvanus, Triumphus, Venus, Virtus, Victoria.
 5 liburnians: Ammon, Diana, Pinnata, Satyra, Varvarina.
 5 other vessels: Clementia, Danubius, Hercules, Mercurius, Victoria.

See also
 Roman navy

References

Sources
 
 

Ravennas
27 BC establishments
Military units and formations established in the 1st century BC
Ravenna